Marshal of the Court was the officer at the Royal Court of Sweden whose task was to assist the king in the Keeper of the Privy Purse. Today the Marshal of the Court are officers of the Office of the Marshal of the Court which is responsible for the Swedish Royal Family's official appearances and representation - preparing and conducting state visits, official visits, formal audiences, official dinners, jubilees, and municipality visits and more. 

The Office of the Marshal of the Court consists of the H.M. The King's Household, H.M. The Queen's Household, Her Royal Highness The Crown Princess's Household, the Royal Stables, the Household and the Ceremonial Household.

First Marshal of the Court

The Office of the Marshal of the Court is headed by the First Marshal of the Court. Supporting him are a Surveyor of the Court, two Court Secretaries, three Court Assistants and two administrative employees.

1844–1849: Gustaf Fredrik Liljencrantz
1869–1872: Erik af Edholm
1907–1928: Carl Malcolm Lilliehöök
1912–1915: Fredrik Peyron
1915–1930: Claes Erik Rålamb
1930–1947: Reinhold Rudbeck
1947–1950: Carl-Reinhold von Essen
1952–1961: Erik Wetter
1962–1973: Stig H:son Ericson
1973–1975: Tom Wachtmeister
1975–1980: Björn von der Esch
1980–1986: Lennart Ahrén
1987–1993: Jan Kuylenstierna
1993–1998: Hans Ewerlöf
1998–2007: Johan Fischerström
2007–2011: Lars-Hjalmar Wide
2012–present: Mats Nilsson

See also
Hofmarschall

Footnotes

References

External links
Office of the Marshal of the Court

Swedish titles
Swedish monarchy